Cláudia Cordeiro Cruz (born 19 June 1967 in Rio de Janeiro) is a Brazilian journalist. She was an anchor on Fantástico, Jornal Hoje and RJTV. Claudia is married to politician Eduardo Cunha, former president of the Chamber of Deputies (away by order of the Supreme Court), with whom he has a daughter and three stepsons. Claudia provides services to various companies and has been questioned in personal spending function. Claudia is an associate of Cunha in some companies, including Jesus.com and C3 productions.

On June 9, 2016, Claudia Cruz was a defendant in the process of Operation Carwash corruption case. Judge Sergio Moro accepted the allegations of the Federal Prosecutor who says she was aware of the crimes practiced and is the only parent of the account in the name of offshore Köpek, Switzerland, through which paid credit card spending abroad in an amount exceeding US$1 million within seven years between 2008 and 2014.

Career 
Discharged from the TV Educativa of Rio de Janeiro, Cruz worked at TV Globo from the end of 1989-2001 presenting the newsprogram Bom Dia Rio between 1989 and 1991, Jornal Hoje possibly between 1989 and 2001, and fixed that same news program from 1992 and 1994 RJTV 1st edition between 1989 and 2001 and RJTV 2nd edition between 1999 and 2001. Claudia also presented the  programs Globo Ciência, Globo Comunidade, Jornal da Globo and Fantástico.

After 2001, she left TV Globo and became anchor for TV Record's second edition of the Jornal da Record, a direct competitor of the Jornal da Globo, which was anchored by Ana Paula Padrão. Cruz was later replaced by Paulo Henrique Amorim. Claudia left the station after receiving an invitation to present the paper Tell River (now defunct). Currently dedicated to plastic arts.

Cruz, besides being a TV presenter, was the voice of TELERJ telephone company, where she met her current husband, and participated in a not credited bit in the film Meu Nome Não é Johnny in a scene that shows the RJTV.

Personal life 
Claudia is married to politician Eduardo Cunha. She has a  daughter from a previous relationship with Carlos Amorim, and a daughter with Cunha. She is also stepmother of the three children from his previous marriage.

Filmography

Programs 
 1996 - 1997: Fantástico 
 1987 - 1989: Sem Censura

Newscasts 
 1989-1992: Bom Dia Rio
 1993-1996  1997-2001: RJTV
 1992-1993: Jornal Hoje
 2001: Jornal da Record 2ª Edição

References

1967 births
Living people
Brazilian journalists
Writers from Rio de Janeiro (city)
20th-century Brazilian people